
Year 467 BC was a year of the pre-Julian Roman calendar. At the time, it was known as the Year of the Consulship of Mamercus and Vibulanus (or, less frequently, year 287 Ab urbe condita). The denomination 467 BC for this year has been used since the early medieval period, when the Anno Domini calendar era became the prevalent method in Europe for naming years.

Events 
 By place 
 Roman Republic 
 Quintus Fabius Vibulanus becomes consul of the Roman Republic for the first of three times.

 Sicily 
 After the death of his brother Hiero I, Thrasybulus becomes Tyrant of Syracuse.

 By topic 
 Literature 
 Aeschylus writes Seven Against Thebes and wins the Dionysia.
 Aeschylus' play, The Persians is produced in Sicily.

 Astronomy 
 The first recorded sighting of Halley's Comet occurs.

Births

Deaths 
 Hiero I, Tyrant of Syracuse

References